Brook Bridges may refer to:

Sir Brook Bridges, 1st Baronet (1679–1728), British barrister
Sir Brook Bridges, 2nd Baronet (1709–1733), of the Bridges baronets
Sir Brook Bridges, 3rd Baronet (1733–1791), British MP for Kent 
Sir Brook William Bridges, 4th Baronet (1767–1829), of the Bridges baronets
Brook Bridges, 1st Baron FitzWalter (1801–1875), British MP for Kent East
Sir Brook George Bridges, 6th Baronet (1802–1890), of the Bridges baronets

See also
Bridges (surname)